The Tiang language, also known as Djaul, is a language spoken in Papua New Guinea.

Overview
It is spoken on Dyaul Island and in 1972 there were 790 speakers reported by Beaumont. On that island Tigak and Tok Pisin are also spoken. Tigak is predominant on the northern half of the island and Tiang on the southern half. The former may be related closely to Tiang. It is also spoken on some other nearby areas in New Ireland Province. The language has a subject–verb–object structure order. The people that speak this language are swidden agriculturalists. There is very little data available for this language.

References

External links
 Map of where Tiang is spoken in Papua New Guinea
 Paradisec has a collection of Malcolm Ross's (MR1) that includes Tiang language materials.

Meso-Melanesian languages
Languages of New Ireland Province